Coffin is an English and French surname.

The House of Coffin is an ancient English family which originated in Devonshire. The Coffins have held a number of manors, the most notable of which is Portledge in Devon, England, which they held for over nine centuries. The progenitor of most of the American Coffins was Tristram Coffin, a Royalist, who came to Massachusetts from the Coffin family farm at Brixton, Devonshire in 1642. He was one of the original proprietors of Nantucket. Tristram Coffin's descendants include the Boston Brahmin, a group of elite families based in and around Boston. Many American Coffins are or were Quakers.

List of persons with the surname Coffin
 Alexander J. Coffin (1794–1868), New York politician
 Alfred Oscar Coffin (1861–1933), African-American professor of mathematics and Romance language, first African American to obtain a PhD in biology
 Alison Coffin (born 1970), Canadian politician
 André Coffyn (born 1908), Belgian painter
 Bill Coffin, American writer of novels and role-playing games
 C. Hayden Coffin, English actor
 C. L. Coffin, American engineer and inventor of the arc welding process using a metal electrode
 Charles Coffin (disambiguation), several people
 Clifford Coffin, English recipient of the Victoria Cross
 Clifford Coffin (photographer), British photographer
 David Coffin, American folk musician
 Edmund Coffin, American saddle maker and equestrian
 Edward Coffin, English Jesuit
 Frank M. Coffin, politician and jurist from the U.S. state of Maine
 Frank Trenholm Coffyn (1878–1960), American aviation pioneer
 Frederick Coffin, American film actor, singer, songwriter and musician
 George Coffin (1903–1994), American bridge player
 Howard A. Coffin (1877–1956), American politician
 Howard E. Coffin (1873–1937), American automobile engineer and founder of Hudson Motors
 Henry Sloane Coffin, American theologian
 Isaac Coffin, British East India Company Army officer
 Sir Isaac Coffin, 1st Baronet, Royal Navy officer
 James Henry Coffin, American mathematician and meteorologist
 Jeff Coffin (born 1965), American saxophonist
 John Coffin (judge) (c. 1751–1838), army officer, judge and politician in New Brunswick
 John Coffin (scientist), American virologist
 Joshua Coffin, American abolitionist
 Levi Coffin (1798–1877), American Quaker, educator and abolitionist
 Lucretia Mott, née Coffin, American antislavery and women's rights advocate
 Marian Cruger Coffin, American landscape architect
 Micajah Coffin, American mariner, trader in the whaling industry and politician
 Millard F. Coffin (born 1955), American marine geophysicist
 Nathaniel Coffin, loyalist and Canadian politician
 Owen Coffin (1802–1821), a teenager on the whaler Essex who was cannibalized
 Peleg Coffin Jr. (1756–1805), American financier, insurer and politician
 Peter Coffin (artist) (born 1972), American artist
 Peter Coffin (bishop), Canadian Anglican Bishop of Ottawa from 1999 to 2007
 Pierre Coffin (born 1967), French film director
 Richard Coffin (1456–1523), sheriff of Devon in 1511
 Robert Aston Coffin, English priest
 Robert P. T. Coffin, American writer and poet
 Shannen W. Coffin, U.S. lawyer
 Thomas Coffin (disambiguation), several people
 Tris Coffin (1909–1990), American actor
 Tristram Coffin (disambiguation), several people
 Walter Coffin, Welsh Member of Parliament and coal owner
 Wesley H. Coffyn (1878–1946), Canadian politician
 William Coffin (disambiguation), several people
 Zenas Coffin, one of the most successful of Nantucket's eighteenth-century whaling merchants

In fiction 
 Adam Coffin, villain in the 1977 film The Deep, based on the novel by Peter Benchley.
Benjamin Coffin III, landlord in Jonathan Larson's musical Rent
 Coffin Family, cursed family in the novel Coffins by Rodman Philbrick
Doctor Coffin: actor Del Manning fakes his death to operate a series of Hollywood mortuaries while fighting crime at night as Doctor Coffin. Written by Perley Poore Sheehan, the stories were originally published in the pulp magazine Thrilling Detective from 1932 to 1933.
 Enoch Coffin, title character of the Lovecraftian fiction anthology Encounters with Enoch Coffin, by W. H. Pugmire and Jeffrey Thomas. Enoch is a painter/sculptor who seeks out the supernatural as inspiration for his art.
 Flower Child Coffin, the title character in the 1973 blaxploitation film, Coffy, starring Pam Grier.
 Frank Coffin, detective in the mystery novel series by Jon Loomis
 Frank Trenholm Coffyn, a real-life aviator trained by the Wright Brothers, appears as a character in Jack Finney's novel From Time to Time
 Ghost of Dr. Coffin, villain in the Scooby-Doo/Dynomutt Hour episode The Harum Scarum Sanitarium. The "ghost" is revealed to be Officer Oldfield
Joe Coffin, mobster/hitman turned vampire hunter in the Joe Coffin series by Ken Preston
 John Coffin, detective in the mystery novel series by Gwendoline Butler
 Jonathan Coffin, "Nonno" in Tennessee Williams' play The Night of the Iguana
M. T. Coffin, pseudonym for various authors of the Spinetinglers series of horror novels for middle-grade children
 Mark Coffin, title character of the political novel Mark Coffin, U.S.S. by Pulitzer Prize winning author Allen Drury.
 Mistress Coffin, murder victim in the novel The Strange Death of Mistress Coffin by Robert Begiebing. Set in New England in 1648, it is apparently based on an actual unsolved murder from that period.
 Peter Coffin, proprietor of "The Spouter Inn" in Herman Melville's novel Moby-Dick
Peter Coffin, investigator of a grizzly crime scene in the mystery novel The Search for My Great Uncle's Head by Jonathan Latimer
 Ray and Steve Coffin, father and son characters in Marvel's Micronauts comic book series; both men assume the persona of Captain Universe
 Robert Coffin, adventurer and ship captain in the novel Maori by Alan Dean Foster

See also 
 Coffin (whaling family)
 Coffin v. United States

English-language surnames
French-language surnames
Surnames of English origin
Surnames of Norman origin
Coffin family